Charles Purcell Cecil (4 September 1893 31 July 1944) was a US Navy Admiral during World War II and two time recipient of the Navy Cross.

Background 
Charles Purcell Cecil was born in Louisville, Kentucky, 4 September 1893. He graduated from the Naval Academy and was commissioned ensign in 1916.

World War II 
Cecil was awarded the Navy Cross for his actions at the Battle of Santa Cruz Islands on 26 October 1942. On 6 July 1943 he was awarded a Bronze Star Medal and a Gold Star in lieu of a second Navy Cross for extraordinary heroism in action against Japanese forces in the Solomon Islands in the Battle of Kula Gulf.

Cecil died in a plane crash near Funafuti on 31 July 1944 while traveling between assignments in the Pacific. 18 others were lost in the accident including Walter S. Gifford Jr., son of the president of AT&T.

Admiral Cecil is buried in Arlington National Cemetery.

Awards and honors 

A graphical representation of a selection of Admiral Cecil's personal decorations:

The  was named in his honor and commissioned on 29 June 1945.

References

External links 
 US Navy letter regarding the loss of the USS Helena
 ANC Explorer

1893 births
1944 deaths
Burials at Arlington National Cemetery
Military personnel from Louisville, Kentucky
Recipients of the Navy Cross (United States)
United States Naval Academy alumni
United States Navy personnel of World War I
United States Navy personnel killed in World War II
United States Navy rear admirals (upper half)
United States Navy World War II admirals
Victims of aviation accidents or incidents in 1944